The 2017–18 season was Feyenoord's 110th season of play, it marked its 62st season in the Eredivisie and its 96th consecutive season in the top flight of Dutch football. It was the third season with manager Giovanni van Bronckhorst, a former player who played seven seasons for Feyenoord and who played 106 times for Dutch national team. Feyenoord entered the KNVB Cup in the first round and the Champions League in the group stage.

Eredivisie

League table

Results summary

Results by matchday

Matches

The fixtures for the 2017–18 season were announced in June 2017.

KNVB Cup

Johan Cruyff Shield

Champions League

Group stage

Player details

Appearances (Apps.) numbers are for appearances in competitive games only including sub appearances
Red card numbers denote:   Numbers in parentheses represent red cards overturned for wrongful dismissal.

Transfers

In:

Out:

References

Feyenoord seasons
Feyenoord
Feyenoord